Alireza Feyz (1925 – March 3, 2019) was an Iranian author, researcher of Islamic jurisprudence and Islamic philosophy, professor at the University of Tehran and jurist.

Birth
Alireza Feyz, son of Ayatollah Mirza Mohammad Feyz and descendant of Mohsen Fayz Kashani, was born on 1925 in Qom, Iran.

Education
From the age of five to seven, Alireza Feyz went to a local Maktabkhaneh in Qom to learn primary concept of Islamic studies.  Then he studied in Mohammadieh Elementary and High School in Qom and got his diploma there. In addition to studying in high school, he studied in the Qom Seminary and gained knowledge from several professors. From 1938 to 1953 he studied advanced concepts of Islamic jurisprudence and principles for 15 years in Qom Seminary and Hawza Najaf. He also studied Islamic philosophy with master Muhammad Husayn Tabatabai. In 1950, with the permission of eminent scholars such as Ayatollah Seyyed Mohammad Mohaqeq Damad and Ayatollah Seyyed Mohammad Taghi Khansari, he reached the level of ijtihad. In the meantime, he taught at some levels of Arabic literature, logic, Islamic jurisprudence, and Principles of Islamic jurisprudence in addition to his studies. In the late 1950s he came to Tehran and entered University of Tehran to study Islamic philosophy there. In 1953, he completed his bachelor's degree in Islamic philosophy and began teaching again in the Qom Seminary. With the opening of the doctoral course in Faculty of Theology and Islamic Studies of the University of Tehran, he was one of the first students of this course in the field of philosophy. He continued his education in this field until doctorate degree. Then he wrote his doctoral dissertation entitled "Critique of Aristotle's logic" and obtained his PhD in Islamic philosophy from Faculty of Theology and Islamic Studies of the University of Tehran in 1963.

Career
From 1957, when he was a PhD course student, he taught Principles of Islamic jurisprudence and Islamic jurisprudence at the Faculty of Theology and Islamic Studies in University of Tehran, and finally reached the rank of full professor. For almost 20 years, he was the director of the Department of Jurisprudence and Fundamentals of Islamic Law in University of Tehran. He continued his scientific activity with universities for about 35 years. In 1981, he was praised by Ali Khamenei then President of Iran as an exemplary professor, and in 1991, as a distinguished professor at the University of Tehran, he received a plaque of honor from Akbar Hashemi Rafsanjani then President of Iran. In 2003 he was selected as a permanent figure at Iranian Science and Culture Hall of Fame in the field of Islamic jurisprudence and law.

During Iranian Cultural Revolution, he was sent to the officer's college and was in charge of teaching Islamic criminal jurisprudence, reviewing books and textbooks in that college.

With the start of the Dehkhoda Dictionary project, he collaborated for 12 years in preparing 14 volumes of the dictionaries.

These are some of his other activities: member of Academy of Sciences of Iran, member of The Organization for Researching and Composing University textbooks in the Humanities, member of The World Forum for Proximity of Islamic Schools of Thought, collaboration with University of Islamic Denominations, Representative of the Faculty of Theology and Islamic Studies in the Committee for the Promotion of Professors of the University of Tehran, collaboration with Tehran School of Law and Political Science, collaboration with Tarbiat Modares University, collaboration with University of Judicial Sciences and Administrative Services, collaboration with Islamic Azad University.

He retired from the University of Tehran in 2001.

Bibliography

Books
 Basis of jurisprudence and principles (title in ), in Persian language, 1984
 Islamic General Criminal Law (title in ), in Persian language, 1984
 Comparison and Application in Islamic Public Criminal Law (title in ), in Persian language, 1985
 Application in the general criminal law of Islam (title in ), in Persian language, 1986
 Translation of Lam'eh book (title in ), in Persian language, Translation, 1987
 Basis of jurisprudence and principles include some of the issues of those two sciences (title in ), in Persian language, 1990
 The Wergild (title in ), in Persian language, Translation, 1993
 A discussion about obstruction (title in ), in Persian language, 1994
 Ethics lessons (title in ), in Persian language, Translation, 1997
 Characteristics of ijtihad and dynamic jurisprudence (title in ), in Persian language, 2003
 Jurisprudential opinions of Mullah Mohsen Feyz Kashani (title in ), in Persian language, 2008
 Legal Thoughts of Custom and Ijtihad (title in ), in Persian language, 2009
 Exclusive (private) criminal law of Islam (title in ), in Persian language
 A critical commentary on the law of retribution, corrections, reprimand and wergilds (title in ), in Persian language
 Dictionary of Terms of Principles of Jurisprudence (title in ), in Persian language
 Critique of Aristotle's logic (title in ), in Persian language
 Ijtihad and Taqlid (title in ), in Persian language
 Role of custom and manners in ijtihad (title in ), in Persian language
 Components and consensus and community of command and prohibition (title in ), in Persian language
 The unity is the reason of Shiite wisdom and the interests of the Sunni messengers (title in ), in Persian language

Articles
 Every year when the month of Muharram arrives (title in ), in Persian language, 1947
 The only important philosophy of Zakat and Khums (title in ), in Persian language, 1947
 Around human (title in ), in Persian language, 1948
 Battle in the shadow of religion and knowledge in the community scene (title in ), in Persian language, 1949
 Mullah Mohsen Feyz Kashani and some fatwas from him (title in ), in Persian language, 1970
 Genesis of logic (title in ), in Persian language, 1971
 Research method in Islamic jurisprudence (title in ), in Persian language, 1972
 Research Method in Islamic Jurisprudence "A Discussion in Evidence" (title in ), in Persian language, 1975
 Contemporary jurisprudence seeks solutions and attempts to resolve jurisprudential differences (title in ), in Persian language, 1979
 Criticize and check of Book (title in ), in Persian language, 1985
 Ijtihad and its history (title in ), in Persian language, 1986
 The value of rational evidence is the reason for wisdom (title in ), in Persian language, 1988
 Characteristics of the jurisprudence of Mullah Mohsen Feyz (title in ), in Persian language, 1988
 The role of time and place in jurisprudence and ijtihad (title in ), in Persian language, 1992
 Lasting Monuments: Waqf and its Motives (title in ), in Persian language, 1994
 Transformation of the judicial system; Nodes and Solutions (title in ), in Persian language, 1994
 The expediency of the endowment and some of its conditions (title in ), in Persian language, 1995
 Application of jurisprudential sources (title in ), in Persian language, 1995
 The path of ijtihad and jurisprudence (title in ), in Persian language, 1995
 Order and disorder in traditional societies, and academia (title in ), in Persian language, 1996
 A study of jurisprudential issues regarding the role of reason, ethics, time and place (title in ), in Persian language, 2001
 Extent of jurisprudence and expression of its examples (title in ), in Persian language, 2002
 Council Ijtihad Roundtable (title in ), in Persian language, 2003
 Customary associations (title in ), in Persian language, 2005
 Custom of the wise (title in ), in Persian language, 2006
 Description of the life and works of Feyz Kashani (title in ), in Persian language, 2007
 Field of Worship Jurisprudence: The Place of Khums in Islamic Economics (title in ), in Persian language, 2008
 Investigating the dynamics factors of jurisprudence (title in ), in Persian language, 2008
 Investigating the authority of fatwa reputation in the principles of affiliates with an approach to the views of Ayatollah Boroujerdi, Khoei and Imam Khomeini (title in ), in Persian language, 2008
 Validity and invalidity of seeing the crescent with the armed eye (title in ), in Persian language, 2009
 Comparison of remittance contract with conversion of obligation and transfer of debt and demand (title in ), in Persian language, 2009
 Relationship between deterrent punishments and punishments in Iranian criminal law (title in ), in Persian language, 2010

Death
Alireza Feyz died on March 3, 2019, at age of 93 in Tehran, Iran. Two days later, the funeral was held for him at the Faculty of Theology and Islamic Studies of the University of Tehran.

See also
 Iraj Afshar
 Mahdi Ahouie
 Mehrdad Avesta
 Mohammad Taqi Danesh Pajouh
 Ali Osat Hashemi
 Ali Akbar Sadeghi

References

External links
 Picture: Dr. Alireza Feyz funeral

1925 births
2019 deaths
Academic staff of the University of Tehran
People from Qom
Philosophy academics
20th-century Iranian lawyers
Faculty of Theology and Islamic Studies of the University of Tehran alumni
Iranian Science and Culture Hall of Fame recipients in Theology